Ricci Harnett (born 20 March 1975) is an English actor, best known for his role as Carlton Leach In the film Rise of the Footsoldier.

He was born in London. He made his screen debut in The Object of Beauty alongside John Malkovich. He also appeared in the film 28 Days Later as Corporal Mitchell. Harnett played the lead character of Carroll Bailey in Porcelain Film's 2009 film Breathe.

Harnett has made a number of appearances on popular television series such as The Thin Blue Line, Casualty and The Bill. He is now playing the role of Dylan in EastEnders.

Filmography
The Object of Beauty (1991) as Steve
Teenage Health Freak (1991, unknown episodes) as Belcher
Between the Lines (1992, 1 episode) as Youth
The Old Curiosity Shop (1995) as Tom
The Thin Blue Line (1995, 1 episode) as Darren Grim
Silent Witness (1997, 1 episode) as Steve Abbott
A Certain Justice (1998) as Gary Ashe
Poof (1999) as Gooner
The Murder of Stephen Lawrence (1999) as Neil Acourt
Starting Out (1999, unknown episodes) as Dean
Strong Language (2000) as Nathan
Micawber (2001) as Gordon
28 Days Later (2002) as Corporal Mitchell
Judge John Deed (2002, 1 episode) as Kevin Helyer
Roger Roger (1996–2003, unknown episodes) as Marlon
Dunkirk (2004) as Guardsman Desmond Thorogood
The Bill (1989–2004, 5 episodes) as Dave Hall
Job Street (2005) as Driver
Dubplate Drama (2005–09) as Prangers
Joy Division (2006) as Sgt Harry Stone
Casualty (1994–2006, 3 episodes) as Jordi (2006) / Colin Miller (1994)
Rise of the Footsoldier (2007) as Carlton Leach
Breathe (2009) as Carroll Bailey
Psychosis (2010) as Peck
Turnout (2011) as Grant
Vendetta (2013) as  Sergeant Joe Windsor
Top Dog (2014) as Mickey
Rise of the Footsoldier:Part 2 (2015) as Carlton Leach
EastEnders (2018) as Dylan Box
The Pebble and the Boy (2021) as Ronnie

References

External links

1975 births
Living people
English male film actors
English male television actors
People from Chipping Sodbury